The 2014 Trophée Éric Bompard was the fifth event of six in the 2014–15 ISU Grand Prix of Figure Skating, a senior-level international invitational competition series. It was held at the Meriadeck Ice Rink in Bordeaux on November 21–23. Medals were awarded in the disciplines of men's singles, ladies' singles, pair skating, and ice dancing. Skaters earned points toward qualifying for the 2014–15 Grand Prix Final.

Entries

Changes to initial lineup
 On August 29, Romain Ponsart and Anais Ventard were chosen as host picks.
 On September 2, Rebeka Kim / Kirill Minov and Miriam Ziegler / Severin Kiefer were added to the roster, in place of host picks.
 On September 16, Kaetlyn Osmond withdrew due to an injury. On September 17, Veronik Mallet was announced as her replacement.
 On September 20, it was reported that Ekaterina Bobrova / Dmitri Soloviev were going to be withdrawing due to an injury to Soloviev. They were officially removed from the roster on October 13th. On October 17, Charlene Guignard / Marco Fabbri were announced as their replacements.
 On November 5, Anais Ventard and Romain Ponsart withdrew from the competition. On November 11, Anna Ovcharova and Douglas Razzano were announced as replacements.
 On November 14, it was reported that Anna Cappellini / Luca Lanotte withdrew due to needing to make changes to their program. They were officially removed from the roster on November 17, and were not replaced.
 On November 17, Song Nan was removed from the roster. No reason has been given and he was not replaced.

Results

Men

Ladies

Pairs

Ice dancing

References

External links
 2014 Trophée Éric Bompard at the International Skating Union
 Starting orders and result details

Trophée Éric Bompard, 2014
Internationaux de France
Figure
Sport in Bordeaux
International figure skating competitions hosted by France
Trophée Éric Bompard, 2014